Joanna Bodak (born 2 January 1974 in Grybów, Lesser Poland Voivodeship) is a retired Polish rhythmic gymnast.

She competed for Poland in the rhythmic gymnastics all-around competition at the 1992 Olympic Games in Barcelona, placing 7th overall.

References

External links 
 Joanna Bodak at Sports-Reference.com

1974 births
Living people
Polish rhythmic gymnasts
Gymnasts at the 1992 Summer Olympics
Olympic gymnasts of Poland
Sportspeople from Lesser Poland Voivodeship
People from Nowy Sącz County